Iran competed at the 1976 Winter Olympics in Innsbruck, Austria. Four athletes represented Iran in the 1976 Olympics, all of them in alpine skiing.

Competitors

Results by event

Skiing

Alpine

Men

References

External links
Official Olympic Reports

Nations at the 1976 Winter Olympics
1976
Winter Olympics
Pahlavi Iran